God's Counting on Me, God's Counting on You (Single) is a 2012 single by Pete Seeger featuring Lorre Wyatt & Friends, produced and arranged by Richard Barone and Matthew Billy, and released by Billy Barone Productions. Originally recorded in 2010 aboard the Hudson River Sloop Clearwater, the song was written immediately after that year's massive BP Oil Spill in the Gulf of Mexico. The spill is referenced in the lyrics. It was Seeger's final single release.

The recording session was filmed live aboard the Sloop, while sailing up and down the Hudson River. The music video, directed by Damien Drake, can be viewed on YouTube: It is one of the few, in not only music video sanctioned and planned with Seeger and filmed especially to accompany one of his songs. The single is available for download on iTunes, Amazon.com, and all digital retailers.

The song and video were released on Election Day, November 6, 2012.

Track listing
 God's Counting on Me, God's Counting on You (Single)

Personnel
Written by Pete Seeger and Lorre Wyatt
Produced by Richard Barone and Matthew Billy

Pete Seeger – lead vocals and banjo
Lorre Wyatt – vocals and acoustic guitar
Richard Barone – background vocals, acoustic guitar, producer
Matthew Billy – harmonica, engineer, producer
Deni Bonet – violin
Steve Holley (Wings) – drums, percussion
Tim Luntzel – bass
Terre Roche - featured backing vocals
Janice Pendarvis - featured backing vocals

Chorus – crew and passengers aboard the Hudson River Sloop Clearwater including Roland Mousaa and Princess Wow; Studio chorus: Janice Pendarvis, Candy John Carr, Jane Cole, Terre Roche, Emilie Cardinaux, Jeremy Rainer, Steve Holley, Deni Bonet, and The Outer Child Choir.

References

Sources
 .
 .

Pete Seeger songs
2010 songs
Songs written by Pete Seeger